Blake McIver Ewing (born March 27, 1985), also known as Blake McIver and Blake Ewing, is an American actor and musician. He was known for playing Michelle's friend, Derek, on the sitcom Full House, a role he reenacted on  Fuller House. He played the role of Waldo in the 1994 feature film version of The Little Rascals and voiced Eugene on Hey Arnold! during its 5th season (replacing Benjamin Diskin, Jarrett Lennon and Christopher Castile). He is currently one of the hosts of the Bravo series The People's Couch.

Ewing co-wrote and performed the song "Along the River", the end credit song for the film End of the Spear. He has contributed his work to the It Gets Better Project, citing his own experiences as a gay teenager as his motivation. His debut album, The Time Manipulator, was released in May 2014. Throughout 2013 Ewing worked as a go-go dancer in Los Angeles. "The tips were good. In fact, I raised so much money, I was able to finish my record — mission accomplished."

Ewing was nominated for an Ovation Award for his role as "The Little Boy" in the Los Angeles production of Ragtime. He is a graduate of UCLA.

Blake released his equality anthem "This Is Who We Are" on July 14, 2015 and works as a host for AfterBuzz TV.

Filmography

Films

Television

Radio

Discography

Albums
2014  The Time Manipulator

References

External links

1985 births
Living people
American child singers
American gay actors
American gay musicians
American gospel singers
American LGBT rights activists
American LGBT singers
American LGBT songwriters
American male child actors
American male film actors
American male television actors
American male pianists
American male songwriters
American pop pianists
LGBT people from California
Gay singers
Gay songwriters
Male actors from Los Angeles
Singers from Los Angeles
Songwriters from California
University of California, Los Angeles alumni
20th-century American male actors
21st-century American male actors
20th-century American male singers
21st-century American male singers
21st-century American pianists
20th-century American singers
21st-century American singers
20th-century LGBT people
21st-century LGBT people
American gay writers